The Intelligence Regiment (EFR) is a regiment of the Royal Danish Army. It was originally created as the Army Intelligence Centre, and was a collection of all intelligence units, created by the Danish Defence Agreement 2013-2017 on the basis of lessons learned in Afghanistan and Iraq. Following the Danish Defence Agreement 2018–23, the centre was upgraded to a regiment and the name was changed.

Structure
Today the Intelligence Regiment	has 2 battalions:
  1 Intelligence, Surveillance & Reconnaissance Battalion
  HQ Platoon
  All-Source Intelligence Cells (ASIC)
  UAS Company
  EW Company, physically placed at Ryes Kaserne in Fredericia
  2 Military Intelligence Battalion 
  Intelligence Fusion Center
Collection, Coordination & Intelligence Requirements Management section (CCIRM)
All Source Analysis Cell (ASAC)
Exploitation section (TECHINT)
  Human Interactiv Company (incl. HUMINT & CIMIC/PSYOPS) 
  Basic Training Company (Conscript)

Names of the regiment

References

Military of Denmark
2014 establishments in Denmark